RuvB-like 1 (E. coli), also known as RUVBL1 and TIP49, is a human gene. RUVBL1 can form a hexamer. The hexamer can form a dodecamer with RUVBL2 protein.
Possesses single-stranded DNA-stimulated ATPase and ATP-dependent DNA helicase (3' to 5') activity; hexamerization is thought to be critical for ATP hydrolysis and adjacent subunits in the ring-like structure contribute to the ATPase activity.

Interactions 

RuvB-like 1 has been shown to interact with:
 ACTL6A, 
 Beta-catenin, 
 EP400,
 Myc,  and
 RUVBL2.

References

Further reading